The Nova Pavlica Monastery is a 14th-century Serbian Orthodox monastery located in Pavlica, Raška, in southwestern Serbia. It belongs to the Eparchy of Žiča. The monastery is located near Stara Pavlica, near river Ibar and near old town of Brvenik.

Establishing 
The monastery was founded by Stefan and Lazar Musić, members of Serbian noble Musić family. Their father was čelnik Musa and mother was Dragana Hrebeljanović, sister of Prince Lazar. The icons in church were painted in 1387. The monastery is dedicated to the Presentation of Mary. The monastery belongs to the Morava architectural school.

The building of Monastery was completed before the Battle of Kosovo, between 1381 and 1388. When relics of Prince Lazar were transferred to the Ravanica Monastery in 1390, they remained during one night in the Nova Pavlica Monastery.

Reconstructions and early mentions 
The church of the monastery was reconstructed and expanded in 1464 by Michael Angelović. The Ottoman defter of Brvenik kadilik probably mentions this monastery when it described it as New Church. In 1955 the façade of the church was repaired.

References

Sources 

 
 
 

14th-century Serbian Orthodox church buildings
Raška District
Serbian Orthodox monasteries in Serbia
Monasteries of the Eparchy of Žiča
Cultural Monuments of Great Importance (Serbia)